Miramichi Centre was a provincial electoral district for the Legislative Assembly of New Brunswick, Canada. It was known as Miramichi-Newcastle from 1974 to 1995.

Members of the Legislative Assembly

Election results

Miramichi Centre

Miramichi-Newcastle

References

External links 
Website of the Legislative Assembly of New Brunswick
Map of Miramichi Centre riding as of 2010 from Elections NB

Politics of Miramichi, New Brunswick
New Brunswick provincial electoral districts